The European Free Alliance Youth (EFAy) is the youth wing of the European Free Alliance European political party. EFAy is a European-wide youth organisation comprised with members who belong to political organisations that safeguard and promote the cultural, linguistic and national diversity of Europe in a progressive way. 
Its political principles are the right for self-determination, the recognition of minorities and ethnic groups, the protection of linguistic diversity inside the EU and in the European institutions, the preservation of the multicultural identity of Europe, an inclusive approach with migration issues, the decentralisation and subsidiarity of the politics to a regional and local level, and the condemnation of any type of discrimination, neither by sex, gender or birthplace.

Bureau

Members and observers

Members
It draws together 33 youth organisations from different regions/nations in 15 European states

References

Free Alliance Youth, European
European Free Alliance